Laffon is a surname. Notable people with the surname include:

André-Daniel Laffon de Ladebat (1746–1829), French financier, politician and philanthropist
Carmen Laffón (1934–2021), Spanish figurative painter and sculptor
Jacques-Alexandre Laffon de Ladebat (1719–1797), French shipbuilder and slave trader
Jakob Amsler-Laffon (1823–1912), Swiss mathematicians, physicist and engineer
Yolande Laffon (1895–1992), French stage and film actress

See also 
Lafon (disambiguation)
Laffoon